GBR-12783 is a psychostimulant which acts as a selective dopamine reuptake inhibitor.

See also
 Vanoxerine
 GBR-12935
 GBR-13069
 GBR-13098
 DBL-583

References

Stimulants
Dopamine reuptake inhibitors
1-(2-(Diphenylmethoxy)ethyl)piperazines